Initiate's Trial is volume nine of the Wars of Light and Shadow by Janny Wurts. It is the first volume of the fourth story arc, Sword of the Canon in the Wars of Light and Shadow epic series. Destiny's Conflict is the second and concluding novel in this arc.

External links
Initiate's Trial at Janny Wurts' official site
Excerpt from Initiate's Trial

American fantasy novels
Wars of Light and Shadow
2011 American novels
HarperCollins books